The 1939 Swiss Grand Prix was a motor race held at Bremgarten on 20 August 1939.

The Grand Prix was run as a combined event for Grand Prix cars and Voiturettes. Each class had a heat with the best from each going through to a combined final. This was the last victory for a German driver driving a German car until Nico Rosberg's victory at the 2012 Chinese Grand Prix.

Classification

Final
Voiturette cars are denoted by a pink background

Grand Prix heat

Voiturette heat

Swiss Grand Prix
Swiss Grand Prix
Grand Prix
August 1939 sports events